The 1995 FINA Diving World Cup was held in Atlanta, United States from Sep 5, 1995 to Sep 9, 1995.

Medal winners

Men

Women

References
 "FINA Diving Results"

External links
 www.fina.org/

FINA Diving World Cup
Fina Diving World Cup
Fina Diving World Cup
Diving competitions in the United States
Sports competitions in Atlanta
International aquatics competitions hosted by the United States